A ketone enolate is an enolate formed from a ketone by reaction with a strong base, such as lithium diisopropylamide, or with a Lewis acid such as dibutylboron trifluoromethanesulfonate and a weak base such as N,N-diisopropylethylamine. In the latter case, the base takes the hydrogen ion from the alpha carbon of the ketone and the electron acceptor atom of the Lewis acid becomes attached to the oxygen of the ketone.

References

Enols
Ketones
Anions